Mie Olise Kjærgaard (born 1974 in Mors, Denmark) is an internationally exhibited Danish artist. She attended the St. Martin's School of Art in London from which she received her MFA in 2007, where she was one of the 4 finalists in the BBC television arranged Four New Sensations.
In 2009 her work was the subject of a one-woman exhibition entitled "The Exquisite Capabilities of The flying Carpet", at the Skive New Museum of Contemporary Art, in Skive, Denmark. Olise is living and working in Copenhagen. She paints large scale paintings of women, seen through a woman's eye (Female gaze)  and view herself as a feminist.

In 2013, Olise painted with muck recovered from the Gowanus Canal.  She had a one-woman exhibition in 2014 at the Museo de Arte Acarigua-Araure in Venezuela. In 2015, Olise's "Noplacia" was exhibited at the Samuel Freeman Gallery. "Noplacia," is a term pulled from opening of Thomas Moore's Utopia, and, according to Kathleen Whitney, writing for Sculpture, the exhibit is "distinguished by abandoned, dystopian, and desolated architectural spaces." Whitney goes on to suggest that "Olise's structures imply that nothing is fixed or stable, that everything is contingent."

She has had solo shows at Honor Fraser, LA; Sammlung Philara, Düsseldorf; MUPO Oacaxa; Y Gallery, New York; Duve Berlin; as well as participating in exhibitions at MFAH (Museum of Fine Arts Houston), MUPO (Museum of Contemporary Art Utah), Torrance Art Museum, LA; Nikolaj Kunsthal, Copenhagen and Trapholt Museum, Denmark.

References

External links
The artist's website - 
ARTSY - 

1974 births
Danish artists
Living people